Azerbaijan competed at the 2014 Winter Olympics in Sochi, Russia from 7 to 23 February 2014. Even though all the athletes that competed for Azerbaijan were foreign-born, the head of the Azerbaijani delegation at the Sochi Olympics Kenul Nurullayeva said: "if Azerbaijan is mentioned, at least for three times during the opening ceremony of the Olympics, it will be a big deal for us. What else do we need besides the publicity? We work for this".
 
At the 2014 Winter Olympics Azerbaijan offered the biggest bonuses for medal-winning athletes among other competing countries ($510,000 for gold, $255,000 for silver and $130,000 for bronze medal).

Rahman Khalilov, president of the country's winter sport federation carried the flag during the opening ceremony.

Alpine skiing  

According to the quota allocation released on January 20, 2014, Azerbaijan has qualified two athletes. Gaia Bassani Antivari had to withdraw from competition, because she sustained an injury during training.

Figure skating 

Azerbaijan has achieved the following quota places:

References

External links 

 
 

Nations at the 2014 Winter Olympics
2014
Winter Olympics